Catharsis is a Russian power metal band founded in 1996.

Lineup
Current
 Oleg Zhilyakov – Lead Vocals (1999–present)
 Oleg Mishin – Lead Guitar (2002–present)
 Igor Polyakov – Rhythm Guitar (1996–present)
 Alexander Timonin – Bass (2002–present)
 Anatoly Levitin – Drums (2008–present)
 Julia Red – Keyboards (1996–present)

Former
 Sergey Bendrikov – Lead Vocals (1996–1998; died 2020)
 Andrey Kapachev – Lead Vocals (1998–1999)
 Anthony Arikh – Lead Guitar (1996–2001)
 Alexey Kraev – Bass (1996–1998)
 Roman Senkin – Bass (1998–2001; died 2017)
 Vladimir Muchnov – Drums (1996–2001)
 Andrey Ischenko – Drums (2005–2005)
 Alexey Barzilovich – Drums (2006–2007)
 Tatiana Korablina – Keyboards, Vocals (1996–1997)
 Alexandra Abanina – Keyboards, Vocals (1997–1998)

Timeline

Discography

Studio albums and EPs
  Proles Florum  (1998) 	
 Febris Erotica (1999) 	
 Dea (2001)
 Imago (2002) -- with lyrics in English
 Имаго (Imago) (2003) --with lyrics in Russian
 Призрачный Свет (Eerie Light) (2004)
 Крылья (Wings) (2005)
  Баллада Земли (Earth' Ballad) (2006)
  Иной (Other) (Internet Single)(2010)
  Светлый альбом (Light album) (2010)
  Индиго  (2014)
  Антология. 20 первых лет. Полное собрание сочинений. (Deluxe gold box-set 16 CDs + Bonus) (2015)
 Время потерь (2018)
 Зеркало Судьбы (Destiny's Mirror) (2019)

Live albums
 Верни им небо (Return to 'em the Sky) DVD (2005)
 Верни им небо (Return to 'em the Sky) 2 CDs (2006)
 15 лет полета (15 Years of Flight) DVD (2012)

Demos
 Child of the Flowers (1997) 	
 Taedium Vitae (1999)
 Prima Scriptio (2003)

References

External links
Official Catharsis website
The Official Fan Club's website
Catharsis' biography on IronD label website
Catharsis on My Space

Musical groups from Moscow
Russian power metal musical groups
Russian heavy metal musical groups
Russian symphonic metal musical groups
Musical groups established in 1996
1996 establishments in Russia